Pedal pushers are calf-length trousers that were popular during the 1950s and the early 1960s. Often cuffed and worn tight to the skin, they are related in style to capri pants, and are sometimes referred to as "clam diggers".  The name "pedal pushers" originated from the style originally worn by cyclists, because long pants can catch in bicycle chains, but the style quickly became identified with teenage girls.

In popular culture
They are the subject of "Pink Pedal Pushers", a 1958 song by Carl Perkins.
A novelty song from the 1950s on MGM records was called "Skin Tight, Pin Striped, Purple Pedal Pushers" by Sheb Wooley, who had his biggest hit with "Purple People Eater". Tom Waits uses a reference to pedal pushers to emphasize the youth of a "little Jersey girl" in the song Heartattack and Vine.

Gallery

See also
Skater clothing
Demi-denims
Plus fours

References

External links

1950s fashion
Trousers and shorts